Patriot Memory is an American designer and manufacturer of PC-based USB flash drives, memory modules, solid state drives and gaming peripherals.
Patriot Memory is based in Silicon Valley and designs, develops, manufactures and assembles computer components locally.

History
PDP Systems was founded in 1985 and named after its founders Paul Jones, Doug Diggs and Phil Young. Jones, Diggs, and Young were high school classmates at Awalt High School in Mountain View, CA.  Jones and Young went on to UC Davis, while Diggs graduated from the University of California at Los Angeles.  PDP Systems started during Jones's time as a student at UC Davis as an OEM builder of computer memory chips into DRAM modules for many of the major PC manufacturers.

Starting in 2003 PDP Systems released their own branded Patriot Memory line of DDR SDRAM to be sold in the retail and online market. Unlike the SDRAM manufacturers that released their SDRAM as bare modules, the Patriot Memory modules featured a bladed metal heat shielding across the entire DDR module. Patriot Memory continued the use of full module heat sinks across each generation of DDR generations to include DDR4.

The Patriot Memory brand eventually became the company name. Patriot Memory has two assembly lines at their facilities in Fremont, California, and Taipei, Taiwan. Jones credits keeping manufacturing in the US as a result of having highly automated machines and reduced shipping costs. Patriot continues to evolve their "VIPER" brand of memory modules, accessories (keyboards, mice, headsets, headset stands, mousepads, and USB flash drives), and "BURST" solid state drives.

References

Further reading
 

Computer hardware companies
Companies established in 1985
Companies based in Fremont, California
1985 establishments in California